The Hindu–Arabic numeral system or Indo-Arabic numeral system (also called the Hindu numeral system or Arabic numeral system) is a positional decimal numeral system, and is the most common system for the symbolic representation of numbers in the world.

It was invented between the 1st and 4th centuries by Indian mathematicians. The system was adopted in Arabic mathematics by the 9th century. It became more widely known through the writings of the Persian mathematician Al-Khwārizmī (On the Calculation with Hindu Numerals) and Arab mathematician Al-Kindi (On the Use of the Hindu Numerals).  The system had spread to medieval Europe by the High Middle Ages.

The system is based upon ten (originally nine) glyphs. The symbols (glyphs) used to represent the system are in principle independent of the system itself. The glyphs in actual use are descended from Brahmi numerals and have split into various typographical variants since the Middle Ages.

These symbol sets can be divided into three main families: Western Arabic numerals used in the Greater Maghreb and in Europe; Eastern Arabic numerals used in the Middle East; and the Indian numerals in various scripts used in the Indian subcontinent.

Origins
The HinduArabic or IndoArabic numerals were invented by mathematicians in India. Persian and Arabic mathematicians called them "Hindu numerals". Later they came to be called "Arabic numerals" in Europe because they were introduced to the West by Arab merchants. According to various sources this number system has its origin in Chinese Shang numerals (1200 BC), which was also a decimal positional value system of base 10.

Positional notation 

The Hindu–Arabic system is designed for positional notation in a decimal system. In a more developed form, positional notation also uses a decimal marker (at first a mark over the ones digit but now more commonly a decimal point or a decimal comma which separates the ones place from the tenths place), and also a symbol for "these digits recur ad infinitum". In modern usage, this latter symbol is usually a vinculum (a horizontal line placed over the repeating digits). In this more developed form, the numeral system can symbolize any rational number using only 13 symbols (the ten digits, decimal marker, vinculum, and a prepended minus sign to indicate a negative number).

Although generally found in text written with the Arabic abjad ("alphabet"), numbers written with these numerals also place the most-significant digit to the left, so they read from left to right (though digits are not always said in order from most to least significant). The requisite changes in reading direction are found in text that mixes left-to-right writing systems with right-to-left systems.

Symbols 

Various symbol sets are used to represent numbers in the Hindu–Arabic numeral system, most of which developed from the Brahmi numerals.

The symbols used to represent the system have split into various typographical variants since the Middle Ages, arranged in three main groups:
 The widespread Western "Arabic numerals" used with the Latin, Cyrillic, and Greek alphabets in the table, descended from the "West Arabic numerals" which were developed in al-Andalus and the Maghreb (there are two typographic styles for rendering western Arabic numerals, known as lining figures and text figures).
 The "Arabic–Indic" or "Eastern Arabic numerals" used with Arabic script, developed primarily in what is now Iraq. A variant of the Eastern Arabic numerals is used in Persian and Urdu.
 The Indian numerals in use with scripts of the Brahmic family in India and Southeast Asia. Each of the roughly dozen major scripts of India has its own numeral glyphs (as one will note when perusing Unicode character charts).

Glyph comparison

History

Predecessors

The Brahmi numerals at the basis of the system predate the Common Era. They replaced the earlier Kharosthi numerals used since the 4th century BC. Brahmi and Kharosthi numerals were used alongside one another in the Maurya Empire period, both appearing on the 3rd century BC edicts of Ashoka.

Buddhist inscriptions from around 300 BC use the symbols that became 1, 4, and 6. One century later, their use of the symbols that became 2, 4, 6, 7, and 9 was recorded. These Brahmi numerals are the ancestors of the Hindu–Arabic glyphs 1 to 9, but they were not used as a positional system with a zero, and there were rather separate numerals for each of the tens (10, 20, 30, etc.).

The actual numeral system, including positional notation and use of zero, is in principle independent of the glyphs used, and significantly younger than the Brahmi numerals.

Development

The place-value system is used in the Bakhshali manuscript; the earliest leaves being radiocarbon dated to the period 224–383 AD. The development of the positional decimal system takes its origins in Indian mathematics during the Gupta period. Around 500, the astronomer Aryabhata uses the word kha ("emptiness") to mark "zero" in tabular arrangements of digits. The 7th century Brahmasphuta Siddhanta contains a comparatively advanced understanding of the mathematical role of zero. The Sanskrit translation of the lost 5th century Prakrit Jaina cosmological text Lokavibhaga
may preserve an early instance of positional use of zero.

These Indian developments were taken up in Islamic mathematics in the 8th century, as recorded in al-Qifti's Chronology of the scholars (early 13th century).

The numeral system came to be known to both the Persian mathematician Khwarizmi, who wrote a book, On the Calculation with Hindu Numerals in about 825, and the Arab mathematician Al-Kindi, who wrote a book, On the Use of the Hindu Numerals ( [kitāb fī isti'māl al-'adād al-hindī]) around 830. Persian scientist Kushyar Gilani who wrote  Kitab fi usul hisab al-hind (Principles of Hindu Reckoning) is one of the oldest surviving manuscripts using the Hindu numerals. These books are principally responsible for the diffusion of the Hindu system of numeration throughout the Islamic world and ultimately also to Europe.

The first dated and undisputed inscription showing the use of a symbol for zero appears on a stone inscription found at the Chaturbhuja Temple at Gwalior in India, dated 876.

In 10th century Islamic mathematics, the system was extended to include fractions, as recorded in a treatise by Abbasid Caliphate mathematician Abu'l-Hasan al-Uqlidisi in 952–953.

Adoption in Europe

Between 967 and 969, Gerbert of Aurillac discovered and studied Arab science in the Catalan abbeys. Later he obtained from these places the book  (On multiplication and division). After becoming Pope Sylvester II in the year 999, he introduced a new model of abacus, the so-called Abacus of Gerbert, by adopting tokens representing Hindu–Arabic numerals, from one to nine.

Leonardo Fibonacci brought this system to Europe. His book  introduced Modus Indorum (the method of the Indians), today known as Hindu–Arabic numeral system or base-10 positional notation, the use of zero, and the decimal place system to the Latin world. The numeral system came to be called "Arabic" by the Europeans. It was used in European mathematics from the 12th century, and entered common use from the 15th century to replace Roman numerals.

The familiar shape of the Western Arabic glyphs as now used with the Latin alphabet (0, 1, 2, 3, 4, 5, 6, 7, 8, 9) are the product of the late 15th to early 16th century, when they entered early typesetting.
Muslim scientists used the Babylonian numeral system, and merchants used the Abjad numerals, a system similar to the Greek numeral system and the Hebrew numeral system. Similarly,  Fibonacci's introduction of the system to Europe was restricted to learned circles.
The credit for first establishing widespread understanding and usage of the decimal positional notation among the general population goes to Adam Ries, an author of the German Renaissance, whose 1522  (Calculating on the Lines and with a Quill) was targeted at the apprentices of businessmen and craftsmen.

Adoption in East Asia 
In 690 AD, Empress Wu promulgated Zetian characters, one of which was "〇". The word is now used as a synonym for the number zero.

In China, Gautama Siddha introduced Hindu numerals with zero in 718, but Chinese mathematicians did not find them useful, as they had already had the decimal positional counting rods.

In Chinese numerals, a circle (〇) is used to write zero in Suzhou numerals.  Many historians think it was imported from Indian numerals by Gautama Siddha in 718, but some Chinese scholars think it was created from the Chinese text space filler "□".

Chinese and Japanese finally adopted the Hindu–Arabic numerals in the 19th century, abandoning counting rods.

Spread of the Western Arabic variant
The   "Western Arabic" numerals as they were in common use in Europe since the Baroque period have secondarily found worldwide use together with the Latin alphabet, and even significantly beyond the contemporary spread of the Latin alphabet, intruding into the writing systems in regions where other variants of the Hindu–Arabic numerals had been in use, but also in conjunction with Chinese and Japanese writing (see Chinese numerals, Japanese numerals).

See also
Arabic numerals
Decimal
History of mathematics
Numeral system
Positional notation
0 (number)

Notes

References

Bibliography
 Flegg, Graham (2002). Numbers: Their History and Meaning. Courier Dover Publications. .
 The Arabic numeral system – MacTutor History of Mathematics

Further reading
Menninger, Karl W. (1969). Number Words and Number Symbols: A Cultural History of Numbers. MIT Press. .
On the genealogy of modern numerals by Edward Clive Bayley

Numeral systems
Numerals
Elementary mathematics
Indian inventions